Hippolyte Montplaisir (March 7, 1839 – June 20, 1927) was a Canadian politician.

Background

He was born on March 7, 1839, in Cap-de-la-Madeleine, Lower Canada and was the son of Paschal Montplaisir and Victoire Crevier.  He was educated at Trois-Rivières and was a farmer. Montplaisir served 25 years as mayor of Cap-de-la-Madeleine and was warden of Champlain County for 6 years. He married E. M. Aylr.

Political career

He was first elected to the House of Commons of Canada for Champlain in the 1874 federal election. A Liberal-Conservative, he was re-elected in 1878, 1882, and 1887. In 1891, he was appointed to the Senate on the advice of John Alexander Macdonald representing the Senatorial Division of Shawinegan, Quebec. He served as an MP and senator for 53 years until his death in 1927.

Death

He died on June 20, 1927 in Trois-Rivières.

Honors

Rue Montplaisir (Montplaisir Street) in Cap-de-la-Madeleine was named to honor him.

Footnotes

External links
 

1839 births
1927 deaths
Canadian senators from Quebec
Conservative Party of Canada (1867–1942) MPs
Conservative Party of Canada (1867–1942) senators
Members of the House of Commons of Canada from Quebec
People from Trois-Rivières
Mayors of places in Quebec